A  or  is the kitchen of a Zen monastery, typically located behind the butsuden (or, Buddha Hall). Historically the kuri was a kitchen which prepared meals only for the abbot and his guests, though in modern Japan it now functions as the kitchen and administrative office for the entire monastery.

See also
Kaisando
Umpan

Notes

References

Zen